Mirpur College is a private college in Mirpur, Dhaka, Bangladesh. It is also known as Mirpur University College. The college is currently teaching about 12,500 students. Boys and Girls have the opportunity to study here. The college is located in Mirpur-2. In addition to the higher secondary education, the college is affiliated to the National University in pursuing undergraduate and postgraduate education.

Faculties
 Bengali
 English
 Finance & Banking
 Management
 Accounting
 Marketing
 Business Education
 Statistics, Math and Computers
 Economics
 BBA Professional
 Computer Science Professional
 Social Work
 Political Science

References

Colleges in Dhaka District
Universities and colleges in Dhaka
Private colleges in Bangladesh
Colleges affiliated to National University, Bangladesh